Franz Xaver von Funk (22 October 1840 – 24 February 1907)  was a German Catholic theologian and historian.

Biography
Funk was born at Abts-Gmünd, Württemberg, and educated at Tübingen, at the seminary of Rottenburg am Neckar, and in Paris, where he studied economics. In 1870 he was appointed professor of theology at Tübingen and in 1876 became an editor of the Tübingen Theologische Quartalschrift. Though he is perhaps best remembered today for his edition of the Apostolic Fathers, he produced a number of other works on early Christian literature. Funk thought the apostolic constitutions were written as late as the beginning of the fifth century.

Select publications
 Zins und Wucher: Eine moral-theologische Abhandlung, 1868.
 Geschichte des kirchlichen Zinsverbotes, 1876, online.
 Opera Patrum apostolicorum, 2 vols., 1878–1881; 2nd ed., 1901. 
 Die Echtheit der Ignatianischen Briefe, aufs neue verteidigt, 1883.
 Doctrina duodecim Apostolorum, 1887.
 Die Apostolischen Konstitutionen: Eine literar-historische Untersuchung, 1891.
 Das 8. Buch der Apostolischen Konstitutionen und die verwandten Schriften, auf ihr Verhältnis neu untersucht, 1893.
 Kirchengeschichtliche Abhandlungen und Untersuchungen, vol. I, 1897; vol. II, 1899; vol. III, 1907.
 Das Testament unseres Herrn und die verwandten Schriften, 1901.
 Didascalia et Constitutiones Apostolorum, 2 vols., 1905.
 Lehrbuch der Kirchengeschichte, 1886; fourth edition, 1902 (published in English as "A Manual of Church History", 2 vols. Trans. by P. Perciballi and edited by W. H. Kent. London: Burns & Oates, 1914.)

Notes

References

External links
 

1840 births
1907 deaths
19th-century German Catholic theologians
German historians of religion
University of Tübingen alumni
Academic staff of the University of Tübingen
19th-century German male writers
German male non-fiction writers